Spoletino may refer to:

Trebbiano, grape variety
Grechetto, grape variety